Alan Trautwig (born February 26, 1956) is a sports commentator who worked with MSG Network, ABC, NBC, NBC Sports Network, and USA Network. He most recently did pre-game and post-game shows for the New York Knicks and New York Rangers, as well as fill-in play-by-play for both teams.

Biography

Early life
Trautwig was a stick boy for the New York Islanders in their early days in the NHL and a ball boy for the New York Nets when they played in the ABA. Both teams used the Nassau Coliseum in Uniondale, New York for their home games. He graduated from H. Frank Carey Junior-Senior High School, in Franklin Square, NY. As a 22-year-old recent college graduate, Trautwig called New York Apollo soccer games on WBAU 90.3 FM, a student-run radio station on Long Island.

Broadcasting career
In the 1980s, Trautwig hosted USA Network's coverage of the National Hockey League; one off-beat feature that he did was to interview a water fountain. He also occasionally would do the sponsor plugs for WWF shows that would air on the USA Network in the mid-'80s. He occasionally guest hosted the NHL on Versus studio program Hockey Central. He also anchored several MISL games from 1978 to 1992. In the late 1980s, Trautwig hosted SportsNite for ABC Sports, leading former network personality Howard Cosell to quip to The Washington Posts Norman Chad, "I don't even know, as God is my witness, or have ever even heard of an Al Trautwig."

Trautwig was one of the original hosts for Classic Sports Network when it was founded in 1996.

The 2000 New York Sportscaster of the Year, Trautwig has covered the last eight Olympic games, and has won New York Sports Emmys for his coverage of the Yankees, Knicks, and Rangers. From 1991–2001, Al was host of the New York Yankees' pre- and post-game shows on MSG Network, and also was in the booth for a few innings per game. In 2006, he hosted the new MSG show called Al Trautwig's MSG Vault, which featured vintage and sometimes discovered lost footage of the New York Knicks and New York Rangers from the 1960s, 1970s, and 1980s.

At the beginning of the 2006 football season Trautwig became a radio host as well, hosting the radio version of NBC's Football Night in America for Westwood One, which co-produces the show (called NBC NFL Sunday''') with the network. However, Trautwig left the show in the middle of the season.
After taking an abrupt leave of absence in September 2019 Trautwig's contract was not renewed after taking some time off when he appeared in a November 2019 broadcast and viewers noted he looked unwell.

He also hosted NBC's coverage of the Ford Ironman World Championship, Foster Grant Ironman World Championship 70.3 and ING New York City Marathon.

 Auto racing, cycling and tennis commentary 
He was a television pit reporter alongside Jim McKay for ABC Sports' coverage of the 1986-1987 Indianapolis 500.

He has co-anchored coverage of the Tour de France (from 2004 to 2007 on Versus (formerly OLN) and in the 1980s for ABC), the Olympics, and NBC's coverage of the Arena Football League. Despite his years of experience as a broadcaster, he was sometimes criticized by cycling fans, for his occasionally uninformed commentary, and his tendency to compare the Tour to various mainstream sports he covers.

From 2005–2008, he also co-anchored USA Network's coverage of the US Open tennis tournament. Trautwig also had a cameo in the movie Cool Runnings'' as an announcer for the bobsled competition. He now co-anchors the US Open's live feed during the tournament.

Gymnastics commentary 
In 2000, Trautwig replaced John Tesh as host of U.S. national and international gymnastics competitions for NBC, including the 2000, 2004, 2008, 2012, and 2016 Olympic games. Trautwig's co-hosts included former Olympic gold medalist Tim Daggett, former Canadian champion gymnast Elfi Schlegel, three-time Olympian John Roethlisberger and 2008 Olympic champion Nastia Liukin.

Trautwig has stated that, at the urging of NBC producers, his gymnastics commentary focused on the personal stories of the gymnasts. During the 2008 Beijing Olympics, he described a gymnast's pre-Olympics injury as "like having a tear in your wedding dress right before you walk down the aisle."

His most notable controversy involved repeatedly referring to the fact that Simone Biles's adoptive parents are her biological grandparents during the 2016 Rio Olympics, refusing to refer to them as her parents. He publicly doubled down on these sentiments on Twitter despite widespread backlash, tweeting, "they may be mom and dad, but they are not her parents." His commentary has resulted in some in the gymnastics community criticizing Trautwig long before the Biles controversy at the 2016 Rio Olympics. Shortly after the conclusion of the 2016 Rio Olympics, Trautwig was permanently removed from gymnastics commentary duty.

References

External links
MSG's Al Trautwig bio
Al's Thoughts on the Hit Show Lost

1956 births
Adelphi University alumni
American television sports announcers
ArenaBowl broadcasters
Arena football announcers
Association football commentators
College basketball announcers in the United States
College football announcers
Cycling announcers
Golf writers and broadcasters
Gymnastics broadcasters
Living people
Major League Baseball broadcasters
Motorsport announcers
National Basketball Association broadcasters
National Football League announcers
National Hockey League broadcasters
New York Rangers announcers
New York Knicks announcers
New York Giants announcers
New York Yankees announcers
North American Soccer League (1968–1984) commentators
Olympic Games broadcasters
People from Nassau County, New York
Skiing announcers
Swimming commentators
Tennis commentators
Bowling broadcasters
Boxing commentators